The Honda CB500T was a Honda motorcycle sold in 1975 and 1976. It bore a close resemblance to the model from which it derived, the 5-speed version of the CB450 which was discontinued in 1974. The engine was a  double overhead cam (DOHC) vertical parallel twin with 180° crankshaft angle, dual CV carburetors and torsion bar valve springs. The transmission was a 5-speed. While not receiving much praise from reviewers or riders, Cycle World took note of its comfortable and roomy seat in its 1975 test, writing, "Unusual in that it is brown in color, it is long enough to carry a briefcase or passenger without crowding the rider. And the padding is soft enough for comfort. Believe us, without this seat you couldn’t ride a 500T very far and get off smiling."

Notes

External links

CB500T
Motorcycles powered by straight-twin engines